Steinar Amundsen (4 July 1945 – 16 June 2022) was a Norwegian sprint canoeist who mostly competed in four-man events. He won a world title in 1970 and 1975, a European title in 1969, and an Olympic gold medal in 1968, placing third at the 1972 Games. His younger brother Harald was also an Olympic canoeist.

Amundsen's achievements also include winning four Nordic championships and 13 national titles. He received the Fearnley Olympic award in 1968.

References

External links

1945 births
2022 deaths
Canoeists at the 1968 Summer Olympics
Canoeists at the 1972 Summer Olympics
Norwegian male canoeists
Olympic canoeists of Norway
Olympic gold medalists for Norway
Olympic bronze medalists for Norway
Olympic medalists in canoeing
ICF Canoe Sprint World Championships medalists in kayak
Medalists at the 1972 Summer Olympics
Medalists at the 1968 Summer Olympics
Sportspeople from Bærum